"Louie, Go Home" is a song written by Paul Revere and Mark Lindsay as a sequel to "Louie Louie" by Richard Berry.  It was recorded by Paul Revere and the Raiders in 1963 and released in March 1964.

Two versions of "Louie, Go Home" were issued. The original (with sax opening) was only released as a single. A re-recorded version (with guitar opening) was featured on the Midnight Ride album in 1966 as well as the group's first Greatest Hits compilation the following year.

Cover versions

Davie Jones with the King Bees version

When manager Leslie Conn obtained an acetate of the Raiders version in 1964, the young David Bowie, then still called David Jones, recorded the song with his band Davie Jones and the King Bees. He titled it "Louie, Louie Go Home" and released it as the B-side of Bowie's first ever single "Liza Jane".

Bowie's version of the song also appeared on the compilations Another Face (1981) and Early On (1964-1966) (1991). Bowie borrowed the call-and-response refrain of 'Just a little bit louder now' for the track "She'll Drive the Big Car" in 2003.

Other versions
The Who also recorded the song as "Lubie (Come Back Home)" in 1965. It was first released on the 1985 compilation Who's Missing.

A French version was released in 1964 as "Louie Reviens Chez Toi" by the Belgian group Ariane et Les 10/20.

Spanish versions were released as "Lupe Vuelve A Casa" by Los Shain's (Peru, 1967) and Los Piedras Rosas (Bolivia, 1971).

Other cover versions include the A-Bones (1993), Ceeds (1966, recorded as "Louie, Come Home), Chambermen (1966), Chesterfield Kings with Mark Lindsay (1998), Coachmen (196?), Jack Ely and the Courtmen (1966), Fireballs (1966), Fugitives (1966), Fuzztones (2015), Grip Weeds (2021), Hypstrz (1981), Images (Italy, 1970), Missing Lynx (1967), Mussies (1966), Shades of Grey (1966), Time Beings (1996), Transatlantics (UK, 1966), Vandells (1967), and Danny Zella and the Zell Rocks (1996).

A 1966 single released with the same title by the Campus Kingsmen is a different song.

Answer song versions include "Louie Come Home" by the Epics in 1965 and "Louie Louie's Comin' Back" by the Pantels in 1966.

References

1964 singles
Paul Revere & the Raiders songs
The Who songs
Answer songs
1964 songs
Columbia Records singles
Sequel songs
Songs written by Mark Lindsay